Below are the squads for the 1954 FIFA World Cup final tournament in Switzerland. Each team had to submit a squad of 22 players. All the teams included three goalkeepers, except England, Mexico, Scotland, South Korea, Uruguay and Yugoslavia, who only named two. This was the first World Cup for which the players were assigned squad numbers.

Scotland were the only team to have players from foreign clubs (namely 7 players from English clubs).

Group 1

Brazil
Head coach: Zezé Moreira

Yugoslavia
Head coach: Aleksandar Tirnanić

France
Head coach: Pierre Pibarot

Mexico
Head coach:  Antonio López Herranz

Roca, Ochoa, Cortes, although registered the official list remained on stand by in Mexico

Group 2

Hungary
Head coach: Gusztáv Sebes

West Germany
Head coach: Sepp Herberger

Turkey
Head coach:  Sandro Puppo

Gurbuz, Günar and Aytaç, although registered the official list remained on stand by in Turkey.

South Korea
Head coach:  Kim Yong-sik

 Only 20 players in South Korea squad.

Group 3

Uruguay
Head coach: Juan López

Austria
Head coach: Walter Nausch

Czechoslovakia
Head coach: Karol Borhy

Scotland
Head coach: Andy Beattie (quit after first match; remaining match was managed by a selection committee)

Only 13 members of the squad travelled to Switzerland for the 1954 tournament. Anderson, Henderson, Mathers, Wilson, Binning, Combe, Copland and McMillan were not required to travel and stayed at home on reserve. Johnstone originally travelled with the squad but returned home injured before the tournament started and was replaced by Hamilton.

Group 4

England
Head coach: Walter Winterbottom

Only 17 of the 22 squad members travelled to Switzerland for the 1954 tournament.  Five players—Ken Armstrong, Allenby Chilton, Johnny Haynes, Harry Hooper and Bedford Jezzard—were put on reserve status and remained at home awaiting a call if the need arose.  It did not.

Switzerland
Head coach:  Karl Rappan

Italy
Head coach:  Lajos Czeizler

Belgium
Head coach:  Doug Livingstone

Players numbered 17–22 did not travel to Switzerland.

References

 weltfussball.de 

Squads
FIFA World Cup squads